Yasovarman II was the ruler of the Khmer empire from 1160 to 1166. He succeeded Dharanindravarman II. In 1165, he was overthrown by the mandarin Tribhuvanadityavarman(ត្រីភូវនាទិត្យាវម្ម៌). His rule ended with his assassination by one of his subordinates.

See also
 Banteay Chhmar
 Banteay Samré

References 

12th-century Cambodian monarchs
Khmer Empire
1166 deaths
Assassinated Cambodian people
Assassinated royalty
Year of birth unknown